Cloverdale, also known as Pierce Shoemaker House, is an historic Colonial Revival home, located at 2600 and 2608 Tilden Street, Northwest, Washington, D.C., in the Forest Hills neighborhood.
It is now known as the Education Office of the Chinese Embassy.

History
The Colonial Revival house was constructed in 1810, before being renovated in 1876, and again in 1910. 
It passed from the family of Isaac Peirce to his nephew Pierce Shoemaker, who expanded the house in 1876. 
Mrs. Clara Newman reportedly remodeled in 1910.

It is now listed on the National Register of Historic Places.

References

Houses on the National Register of Historic Places in Washington, D.C.
Houses completed in 1810